Vicopisano is a comune (municipality) in the Province of Pisa in the Italian region Tuscany, located about  west of Florence and about  east of Pisa. It occupies the former valley of the Arno River (which now flows some km southwards), bounded by the Monte Pisano from north.

History
In medieval times Vicopisano was a flourishing fortified center of the Republic of Pisa. It was conquered by Florence in 1406. Here a castle (Rocca Nuova) designed by Filippo Brunelleschi was built in 1434.

Geography
Vicopisano borders the following municipalities: Bientina, Buti, Calci, Calcinaia, Cascina and San Giuliano Terme. It counts the hamlets (frazioni) of Caprona, Cucigliana, Lugnano, Noce, San Giovanni alla Vena and Uliveto Terme.

Demographics

Economy
Economical activities include ceramics, mechanics (Piaggio) and bottling of mineral waters. The agriculture is based on olive oil and cereals.

Main sights
 Brunelleschi Rocca (castle), with an annexed Romanesque church from the 12th century
 12 medieval towers
 Pieve di Santa Maria (12th century), with 13th-century frescoes.
 Pieve di San Jacopo
 Palazzo Pretorio (12th century)
 Palazzo della Vecchia Posta (12th century)
 Villa Fehr

Gallery

Notable people
Domenico Cavalca (1270-1342), writer

References

External links

  Vicopisano official website
  Vicopisano tourist portal

Cities and towns in Tuscany
Castles in Italy